Arghoslent is an American death metal band from Oakton, Virginia, formed in mid-1990. While acclaimed in the metal underground for their trad metal-influenced brand of galloping riffs and bluegrass-style guitar leads, the band's lyrics have been the source of much controversy. Arghoslent's primary lyrical themes include racism, white supremacy, apologia for the trans-Atlantic slave trade, misogyny, the Holocaust, eugenics, imperialism, and European genocide efforts against Native Americans, among other atrocities.

As of 2021, Arghoslent has all material and lyrics written for their as-of-yet untitled fourth studio album, but tracking was delayed due to the travel restrictions caused by the ongoing COVID-19 pandemic, until 2022.

Members

Current lineup 
 Pogrom (Alex Halac) – guitars (1990–present)
 Holocausto (Nick Mertaugh) – guitars (1993–1997, 2000–present)
 Einzelganger – bass (2006–present)
 Ulfhedinn – vocals (2007–present)
 Aktion T4 – drums (2007–present)

Former members 
 Kommando (Thomas Huff) – bass (1990–2002)
 Gravedigger (Greg Harris) – vocals (1991–1995)
 Von Demonicus (Zachary Kitts) – vocals (1995–2002)
 Alienchrist (Matt Sylvester) – drums (1997–2007)
 The Genocider – vocals (2006–2007)

Timeline

Discography

Demos 
 The Entity cass. (1991)
 Bastard Son of One Thousand Whores cass. (1992)
 The Imperial Clans cass. (1994)
 Arsenal of Glory cass. (1996)

Albums 
 Galloping Through the Battle Ruins CD / LP / cass. (1998)
 Incorrigible Bigotry CD / LP / cass. (2002)
 Hornets of the Pogrom CD / LP / cass. (2008)

EPs 
 Troops of Unfeigned Might 7-inch EP (2000)

Splits 
 Arghoslent / Stargazer split 7-inch EP (2001)
 Arghoslent / Morbid Upheaval split 7-inch EP (2004)
 Arghoslent / Mudoven / Der Stürmer split 7-inch EP (2005)
 Send Forth the Best Ye Breed split with Martial Barrage CD / LP (2009)

Compilations 
 Arsenal of Glory CD / LP (2000)
 1990-1994: The First Three Demos CD / LP (2009)
 Unconquered Soldiery CD / LP (2020)

References

External links
 Arghoslent Official Site
 Official label and distro site for Arghoslent, Grand Belial's Key, Absurd, and Crucifier
 Arghoslent interview (2008) at The Left Hand Path
 Arghoslent interview at Tartarean Desire
 Arghoslent's listing on The Metal Archives

Heavy metal musical groups from Virginia
American death metal musical groups
Musical groups established in 1990
White supremacist groups in the United States